Aung Thu born  is a Burmese volleyball player, playing as an outside hitter. He was part of the Myanmar national volleyball team. He won the bronze medal at the 2015 Southeast Asian Games. He participated at the 2010 Asian Games and 2014 Asian Games.He also participated in Asian men u 23 volleyball championship where Myanmar finished 5th among 16 participating countries.

Career 
Thu played with Chonburi from 2012 to 2015.

In October 2018, Aung Thu signed for V.League Division 1 club Toray Arrows.

Clubs 
  Chonburi E-Tech Air Force (2012–2015)
  Nakhon Ratchasima (2015–2018)
  Toray Arrows (2018–)

Awards

Individual 
 2016 Thai-Denmark Super League "Most Valuable Player"
 2017 Thai-Denmark Super League "Best Spiker"
 2017–18 Thailand League "Most Valuable Player"

Clubs 
 2012–13 Thailand League -  Bronze medal, with Chonburi
 2013–14 Thailand League -  Runner-up, with Chonburi
 2014–15 Thailand League -  Runner-up, with Chonburi E-Tech Air Force
 2016 Thai-Denmark Super League -  Champion, with Nakhon Ratchasima
 2016–17 Thailand League -  Runner-up, with Nakhon Ratchasima
 2017 Thai-Denmark Super League -  Champion, with Nakhon Ratchasima
 2017–18 Thailand League -  Champion, with Nakhon Ratchasima
 2018 Thai-Denmark Super League -  Bronze medal, with Nakhon Ratchasima
 2018–19 V.League -  Bronze medal, Toray Arrows

References

1993 births
Living people
Burmese men's volleyball players
Burmese expatriates in Japan
Burmese expatriate sportspeople in Thailand
Asian Games competitors for Myanmar
Place of birth missing (living people)
Volleyball players at the 2010 Asian Games
Volleyball players at the 2014 Asian Games
Volleyball players at the 2018 Asian Games
Southeast Asian Games bronze medalists for Myanmar
Southeast Asian Games medalists in volleyball
Competitors at the 2015 Southeast Asian Games
Competitors at the 2021 Southeast Asian Games
Expatriate volleyball players in Thailand
Expatriate volleyball players in Japan